Alan Matthews (3 May 1913 – 1996) was an English cricketer. He played for Gloucestershire between 1933 and 1938.

References

External links

1913 births
1996 deaths
English cricketers
Gloucestershire cricketers
People from Keynsham
Wiltshire cricketers